Mike and Ike is a brand of fruit-flavored candies that were first introduced in 1940 by the company Just Born, Inc. The origin of the candy's name remains unknown, but there are many conjectures. Mike and Ikes were originally all fruit flavored but now come in several different varieties which have been introduced over the years.

History
Mike and Ike is located in Bethlehem, Pennsylvania. People have claimed that the name may have come from the comic strip Mike and Ike (They Look Alike), which had ended by the 1940s. Or the name may have referred to the Matina Brothers, two of whom, nicknamed "Mike" & "Ike," were billed as circus dwarves and had roles as Munchkins in the 1939 film The Wizard of Oz; author Dean Jensen claimed the two brothers had become so popular in America that a boxed candy was named after them.  Other proposals include a company-wide contest, the creators' names being Mike and Ike, a vaudeville song titled “Mike and Ike”, and Dwight D. Eisenhower, whose nickname was "Ike." Just Born acquired the Rodda Candy Company in 1953 and produced new flavors of the candy, such as cotton candy. Additional flavors such as Root Beer came in the 1960s, and others have been introduced on and off since.

Candy
Mike and Ikes are oblong fruit-flavored chewy candies that come in several colors and varieties, including cherry, strawberry, orange, lemon, and lime. Popular varieties are Tropical Typhoon, Berry Blast and Jolly Joes. Each candy has 7 calories, 0 grams of fat, and approximately 1 gram of sugar.  The candy is kosher and gluten-free.

They are similar to Hot Tamales, another candy introduced by the same manufacturer in 1950, though they are not spicy.

Varieties
Just Born produces several varieties of Mike and Ikes, including:

Retro/limited varieties include:
Lem and Mel (Lemon and watermelon) flavor (launched 1991; reissued 2013)
Cherri and Bubb (Cherry and bubble gum) flavor (launched 1989; reissued 2013, then again in 2019)
Strawbana (launched 1991)
Mike and Ike – Strawberries n' Cream (launched 2000; reissued 2019)
Mike and Ike – Oranges n' Cream (launched 2000)
Cherry Cola (launched 2004, reissued 2016)
Buttered Popcorn (launched 2004, reissued 2016)
Mike and Ike Minion Mix – Blueberry and Banana flavors (launched 2014)
Mike and Ike Valentines Mix (Seasonal)
Mike and Ike Mummy's Mix (Seasonal)
Mike and Ike Merry Mix (Seasonal) (launched 2015)
Mike and Ike Sundae Sweets (Limited edition) (launched 2017)
Mike and Ike Cotton Candy (Limited edition) (reissued 2015, then again in 2021)
Mike and Ike Rootbeer Float (Limited edition) (reissued 2015, then again in 2021)

There are also seasonal packages for Easter in which the Mike and Ike flavors are formed as jelly beans.

Media
In April 2012, the company ran an ad campaign based on the premise that Mike and Ike were "breaking up" due to "creative differences"; the packaging showed one or the other name scratched out. The campaign was intended to capture the interest of younger consumers. In 2013 the company announced Mike and Ike would reunite. In addition to a re-designed packaging and juicier tasting candy, a trailer for a movie was released, entitled, The Return of Mike and Ike.

References

External links
 
 
 
 

Brand name confectionery
Just Born brands
Kosher food
Products introduced in 1940
American confectionery